Miętkie  is a village in the administrative district of Gmina Mircze, within Hrubieszów County, Lublin Voivodeship, in eastern Poland, close to the border with Ukraine.

History

World War II
During the World War II, in March 1944, Turkowice was attacked by Polish partisans in reprisal for the Massacres of Poles in Volhynia carried out by Ukrainian nationalists. 105 Ukrainian villagers were murdered and 160 houses destroyed.

References

Villages in Hrubieszów County
Massacres of Ukrainians during World War II